Fred Goodwin v News Group Newspapers and VBN ([2011] EWHC 1437 (QB)) is a 2011 privacy case involving Fred Goodwin.

Facts
The claimant sought an injunction preventing publication of the fact he had an affair with a co-worker. After widespread publication of this information the defendant was successful in getting the injunction discharged. However, the defendant now also sought to identify the woman involved.

Judgment
Tugendhat J ruled that publication of the identity of the woman would not be in the public interest.

References

English privacy case law